Shadow of Love may refer to:

 "The Shadow of Love", a song by The Damned (1985)
 "Shadow of Love", a song by Quiet Riot from Guilty Pleasures (2001)
 "Shadow of Love", a song by Celine Dion from Taking Chances (2007)